Smaragdia souverbiana is a species of sea snail, a marine gastropod mollusk in the family Neritidae.

Description
Smaragdia souverbiana is a small (<2mm aperture) seagrass associated Nerite.  Its shell is sand to green in colour, with distinctive thin black bands with embedded clear diamonds across the whorls.  It is commonly found in seagrasses, where it is believed to feed directly on seagrass cells (rather than algae epiphyte like many other seagrass associated gastropods). Feces examined from specimens collected from the intertidal zone contained both seagrass and epiphyte material.

Distribution

This species is distributed in the Indian Ocean along Madagascar and the Aldabra Atoll, and in the Mediterranean Sea.  It is also widely distributed throughout the Indo-Pacific, with records of its collection along the east (as far south as southern New South Wales) and west coasts for Australia, through Indonesia and Malaysia to the Philippines and New Caledonia.

References

 Dautzenberg, Ph. (1929). Mollusques testacés marins de Madagascar. Faune des Colonies Francaises, Tome III
 Fischer-Piette, E. & Vukadinovic, D. (1973). Sur les Mollusques Fluviatiles de Madagascar. Malacologia. 12: 339-378.
 Taylor, J.D. (1973). Provisional list of the mollusca of Aldabra Atoll
 Fischer-Piette, E. & Vukadinovic, D. (1974). Les Mollusques terrestres des Iles Comores. Mémoires du Museum National d'Histoire Naturelle, Nouvelle Série, Série A, Zoologie, 84: 1-76, 1 plate. Paris.
 Gofas, S.; Le Renard, J.; Bouchet, P. (2001). Mollusca, in: Costello, M.J. et al. (Ed.) (2001). European register of marine species: a check-list of the marine species in Europe and a bibliography of guides to their identification. Collection Patrimoines Naturels, 50: pp. 180–213 
 Streftaris, N.; Zenetos, A.; Papathanassiou, E. (2005). Globalisation in marine ecosystems: the story of non-indigenous marine species across European seas. Oceanogr. Mar. Biol. Annu. Rev. 43: 419–453
 Fowler, O. (2016). Seashells of the Kenya coast. ConchBooks: Harxheim. Pp. 1–170.

External links
 Souverbie [S.-M. & Montrouzier [X.]. (1863). Description d'espèces nouvelles. Journal de Conchyliologie. 11: 74-77]
 Angas, G. F. (1871). Description of thirty-four new species of shells from Australia. Proceedings of the Zoological Society of London. (1871): 13-21, pl. 1
 Tapparone Canefri, C. (1875). Contribuzioni per una fauna delle isole papuane. II. Descrizione di alcune spezie nuove o mal conosciute delle isole Aru, Sorong e Kei Bandan. Annali del Museo civico di storia naturale di Genova. 7: 1028-1033
 Gassies, J. B. (1863). Faune conchyliologique terrestre et fluvio-lacustre de la Nouvelle-Calédonie
 Katsanevakis, S.; Bogucarskis, K.; Gatto, F.; Vandekerkhove, J.; Deriu, I.; Cardoso A.S. (2012). Building the European Alien Species Information Network (EASIN): a novel approach for the exploration of distributed alien species data. BioInvasions Records. 1: 235-245
 Zenetos, A.; Çinar, M.E.; Pancucci-Papadopoulou, M.A.; Harmelin, J.-G.; Furnari, G.; Andaloro, F.; Bellou, N.; Streftaris, N.; Zibrowius, H. (2005). Annotated list of marine alien species in the Mediterranean with records of the worst invasive species. Mediterranean Marine Science. 6 (2): 63-118

Neritidae
Gastropods described in 1863